Seussical is a musical comedy by Lynn Ahrens and Stephen Flaherty, based on the many children's stories of Dr. Seuss, with most of its plot being based on Horton Hears a Who!, Gertrude McFuzz, and Horton Hatches the Egg while incorporating many other stories. The musical's name is a portmanteau of "Seuss" and the word "musical". Following its Broadway debut in 2000, the show was widely panned by critics, and closed in 2001 with huge financial losses. It has spawned two US national tours and a West End production, and has become a frequent production for schools and regional theatres.

Plot
This synopsis describes the tour version of the show, currently being licensed as "Seussical the Musical" by Music Theatre International (MTI).

Act I 
The show opens on a bare stage, save for an odd red-and-white-striped hat in the center. A small boy wanders into view and notices the hat, wondering to whom it might belong. He finally mentions the Cat in the Hat, who appears before the Boy and tells him he has been brought to life by the Boy's "Thinks". The Cat urges this boy to Think up the "Seussian" world and characters around the boy and himself ("Oh, the Thinks You Can Think!"). The Cat then reveals to the Boy that he is about to tell a story about someone as imaginative as the Boy is.

To begin the story, the Cat encourages the Boy to think up the Jungle of Nool, where Horton the Elephant is bathing. Horton hears a strange noise coming from a nearby speck of dust, and reasons that someone must be on it, calling out for help. He carefully places the speck on a soft clover and decides to guard it ("Horton Hears a Who"). But he is mocked mercilessly by the Sour Kangaroo and the other animals of the jungle, who do not believe him ("Biggest Blame Fool"). The only exceptions are Horton's bird neighbors, Gertrude McFuzz, who admires his compassion, and Mayzie LaBird, who is more concerned about herself.

Horton soon discovers that the speck is actually a microscopic planet populated by creatures called Whos. The citizens of Who-ville introduce themselves and their yearly Christmas pageant directed by their friend the Grinch. They also reveal that in addition to being unable to control where the speck flies, they are on the brink of war and their entire population of Truffula Trees has been cut down ("Here on Who"). The Whos thank Horton and ask for his protection, and he agrees to guard their planet.

At this point, the Cat pushes the Boy into the story; he becomes Jojo, the son of the Mayor of Who-ville and his wife. Jojo has been getting into trouble at school for having Thinks, so his parents order him to "take a bath and go to bed, and think some normal Thinks, instead". Jojo blames the Cat for getting him into trouble and tries to send him away. The Cat refuses and persuades Jojo to imagine the tub is McElligot's Pool ("It's Possible"). Jojo inadvertently floods the house, leading the Mayor and his wife to contemplate what to do with their son ("How to Raise a Child"). When the Cat hands them a brochure, they decide to send Jojo to a military school run by General Genghis Khan Schmitz, who is preparing to go to war with those who eat their bread with the butter side down ("The Military"). While there, Jojo meets Horton, and finds a mutual friend in him ("Alone in the Universe").

Gertrude, meanwhile, has fallen in love with Horton, but is afraid he does not notice her because of her own tail, which consists of only "one droopy-droop feather" ("The One Feather Tail of Miss Gertrude McFuzz"). At the advice of Mayzie, whose tail is enormous and dazzling, she consumes pills which make her tail grow new feathers. Gertrude is so excited that she overdoses, causing her tail to grow long and unwieldy ("Amayzing Mayzie"/"Amazing Gertrude").

Horton is ambushed by the Wickersham brothers, a gang of delinquent monkeys, who steal the clover and make off with it ("Monkey Around"). Horton gives chase until the Wickershams hand the clover to an eagle named Vlad Vladikoff, who drops it into a large patch of identical clovers ("Chasing the Whos"). Here, the Cat cuts briefly into the action to remind the audience how lucky they are to not be Horton ("How Lucky You Are"). Undeterred, Horton begins to look for the clover, hoping the Whos are still alive, when Gertrude catches up with him and tries to get him to notice her new tail. Horton is too busy, so she leaves to take more pills ("Notice Me, Horton").

Horton is about to search his three millionth clover when he loses hope. Mayzie, sitting in a nearby tree, offers to help him forget about the Whos by hatching an egg that she is too lazy to care for ("How Lucky You Are (Reprise)"). Horton reluctantly agrees, and Mayzie leaves for a vacation. Horton sits through months of harsh weather as he tries to decide between the egg and the Whos ("Horton Sits on the Egg") before he is captured by hunters, who take him away along with the entire tree. Gertrude tries to stop the hunters, but cannot fly due to her heavy tail.

The Cat closes the act with a reprise of "How Lucky You Are", and conducts the band during the intermission.

Act II 
Horton, still hatching the egg, is auctioned off to the traveling Circus McGurkus ("Egg, Nest, and Tree"/"Circus McGurkus"/"How Lucky You Are (Reprise)"). At one show in Palm Beach, he meets up with Mayzie, who insists that he keep the egg for himself before leaving ("Amayzing Horton"). Horton mourns the loss of the Whos and Jojo, but vows just as surely to protect the egg, as it, too, is alone without its mother ("Alone in the Universe (Reprise)"), and sings it a lullaby with Jojo about a magical place called Solla Sollew. At the same time, the Mayor and his wife begin to miss Horton and Jojo, and wish for Solla Sollew, as well ("Solla Sollew").

Jojo is with General Schmitz and his platoon as the Butter Battle commences. Jojo deserts Schmitz, but sprints into a minefield and vanishes in an explosion. Schmitz assumes the worst and heads to Who-ville to tell Jojo's parents that their son has died. The Cat returns to perform a re-enactment of the dramatic scene. But in reality, Jojo has survived, but is lost with no idea of where to turn. The Cat appears to him with a band of Hunches, encouraging him to use his Thinks to find his way home ("Havin' a Hunch"). Jojo does so and happily reunites with his parents, who forgive him for his Thinks.

Gertrude sneaks into the circus to free Horton, explaining she plucked out all but one of her tail feathers to fly there, and confesses her love for him. She also reveals she has found his clover, delighting and relieving Horton to find the Whos alive and well ("All For You"). However, the Sour Kangaroo and the Wickersham brothers arrive to take Horton back to the jungle.

In the jungle, Horton is put on trial for the crimes of "talking to a speck, disturbing the peace, and loitering... on an egg"  ("The People Versus Horton the Elephant"). Aided by Gertrude, Horton makes his best case, but Judge Yertle the Turtle finds him guilty. He orders Horton remanded to the "Nool Asylum for the Criminally Insane" and the clover destroyed in a kettle of hot "Beezle-Nut" oil. Desperate, Horton encourages the Whos to make as much noise as possible to prove their existence, but the animals do not hear them. Jojo finally uses his Thinks to conjure a new word, "Yopp", which he shouts loudly enough to reach the animals' ears. Convinced at last, the animals repent and promise to help protect the Whos, and Horton is acquitted. Jojo is accepted by his parents and the rest of Who-ville as "Thinker Non-Stop" for saving their planet. Horton's egg hatches into a tiny flying "Elephant-Bird", amazing everyone, but dismaying Horton, who panics at the thought of flying progeny. Gertrude reassures him that they can raise the child together, and they agree to do so.

With the story finished, the Cat returns to close the show with ("Finale - Oh, the Thinks You Can Think!"), then vanishes along with the scenery, leaving only his hat and Jojo, who is now the Boy again. The Boy picks the hat up, dons it, and says, "Seuss!"

During a curtain call, the company performs a number based on Green Eggs and Ham ("Green Eggs and Ham").

Cast

† In the Broadway production and the 1st US National Tour, the role of Jojo was alternated by two actors.

Notable Broadway replacements 
 The Cat in the Hat: Rosie O'Donnell, Cathy Rigby
 Jojo: Aaron Carter, Cameron Bowen, Andrew Keenan-Bolger

Characters

Major characters
 The Cat in the Hat, the narrator of the story, the Cat also appears as the following minor characters:
 Doctor Dake - during "Amazing Gertrude" and "All for You"
 Louie Armstrong / Piano Player
 Auctioneer
 Mr. McGurkus, the owner of the Circus McGurkus
 Jose the Pool Boy - during "How Lucky You Are" (Reprise)
 Jojo, an imaginative and misunderstood young boy
 Horton, a compassionate and determined elephant
 Gertrude McFuzz, a shy bird who falls in love with Horton and endeavors to help him
 Mayzie La Bird, Horton's vivacious, lazy, self-centered, generous, and fun-loving bird neighbor

Fun characters
 Sour Kangaroo, the boisterous rude voice of the jungle who turns everyone against Horton
 Bird Girls, Mayzie's friends, who act as a Greek chorus
 Wickersham Brothers, a gang of monkeys who mock Horton and steal the clover
 Mr. Mayor, the newly elected mayor of Who-ville and Jojo's father
 Mrs. Mayor, the Mayor's wife and Jojo's mother
 General Schmitz, the warmongering leader of the butter battle
 The Grinch, a notable resident of Who-ville who is responsible for organizing the Christmas pageant based on the tale of his own redemption
 Young Kangaroo, the child of Sour Kangaroo
 Yertle the Turtle, the judge who presides over the Jungle of Nool's court
 Vlad Vladikoff, an eagle who helps the Wickershams lose the clover

Other characters
 Whos - citizens of Who-ville
 Cadets - members of Schmitz's platoon
 Jungle Creatures - chorus and dancers in jungle scenes
 Hunches - dancers in "Havin' a Hunch"
 Circus Animals - the animals of the Circus Dumbo

 Fish - residents of McElligot's Pool during "It's Possible"
 Thing 1 and Thing 2 - help the Cat work Jojo's imagination in "A Day for the Cat in the Hat"

Musical numbers

Act I
 "Overture" – Orchestra/The Boy Who Thinks 		
 "Oh, the Thinks You Can Think!" – The Cat in the Hat and Company
 "Horton Hears a Who"  – Bird Girls, Horton the Elephant and Citizens of the Jungle of Nool
 "Biggest Blame Fool" – Sour Kangaroo, Young Kangaroo, Horton the Elephant, Wickersham Brothers, Bird Girls, Gertrude McFuzz, Mayzie LaBird, Citizens of the Jungle, the Boy and The Cat
 "Here on Who" – The Mayor, Mrs. Mayor, The Grinch, Whos, Schmitz and Horton
 "A Day for the Cat in the Hat"  – The Cat in the Hat, JoJo and the Cat's Helpers
 "It's Possible (In McElligot's Pool)"  – JoJo, The Cat in the Hat and Fish
 "How to Raise a Child" – The Mayor and Mrs. Mayor
 "The Military" – General Genghis Khan Schmitz, The Mayor, Mrs. Mayor, JoJo and Cadets
 "Alone in the Universe" – Horton the Elephant and JoJo
 "The One Feather Tail of Miss Gertrude McFuzz" – Gertrude
 "Amayzing Mayzie" – Mayzie LaBird, Gertrude and the Bird Girls
 "Amayzing Gertrude" – Gertrude and Bird Girls
 "Monkey Around" – Wickersham Brothers and Horton the Elephant
 "Chasing the Whos"  – Horton the Elephant, Sour Kangaroo, Young Kangaroo, Bird Girls, Wickersham Brothers, The Cat in the Hat, Vlad Vladikoff and Whos
 "How Lucky You Are" – The Cat in the Hat and Whos
 "Notice Me, Horton" – Gertrude McFuzz and Horton
 "How Lucky You Are" (Reprise) – Mayzie LaBird and Horton the Elephant
 "Horton Sits on the Egg / Act I Finale" – Full Company

Act II
 "Entr'acte"  – Orchestra
 "Our Story Resumes"  – The Cat in the Hat, JoJo, Horton, Gertrude McFuzz, General Genghis Khan Schmitz, Bird Girls and Hunters
 "Egg, Nest, and Tree"  – Sour Kangaroo, Bird Girls, Wickersham Brothers, The Cat in the Hat and Hunters
 "The Circus McGurkus"  – The Cat in the Hat, Horton and Circus Animals
 "The Circus on Tour"  – Horton
 "Mayzie in Palm Beach" – Mayzie LaBird, The Cat Jose the Pool Boy and Horton
 "Amayzing Horton" – Mayzie LaBird and Horton
 "Alone in the Universe" (Reprise) – Horton the Elephant
 "Solla Sollew" – Horton, The Mayor, Mrs. Mayor, JoJo, and Circus McGurkus Animals and Performers
 "The Battle of the Butter"  – JoJo, General Genghis Khan Schmitz and Cadets
 "The Grinch Carved the Roast Beast"  – The Grinch, The Mayor, Mrs. Mayor, Cindy Lou Who, Max the Dog, Schmitz and Whos
 "Havin' a Hunch"  – The Cat in the Hat, JoJo, Hunches and the Cat's Helpers
 "All for You" – Gertrude, Horton and Bird Girls
 "The People Versus Horton the Elephant"  – Principals (except Mayzie and Schmitz), Wickershams, Yertle, Bird Girls, Young Kangaroo
 "Finale" / "Oh, the Thinks You Can Think!" (Reprise) – Full Company
 "Curtain Call" / "Green Eggs and Ham" – Full Company

Contributing Dr. Seuss books
Seussical incorporates these Dr. Seuss stories:

 Horton Hears a Who!
 Gertrude McFuzz
 How the Grinch Stole Christmas!
 The Lorax
 Green Eggs and Ham
 Hop on Pop
 Yertle the Turtle
 Horton Hatches the Egg
 I Had Trouble in Getting to Solla Sollew
 And to Think That I Saw It on Mulberry Street
 McElligot's Pool

 Oh Say Can You Say?
 Hunches in Bunches
 If I Ran the Circus
 Dr. Seuss's ABC
 The Butter Battle Book
 Oh, the Thinks You Can Think!
 Fox in Socks
 The Cat in the Hat
 The Sneetches and Other Stories
 Did I Ever Tell You How Lucky You Are?
 Oh, the Places You'll Go!

Productions

Pre-Broadway
In a reading in New York City, Eric Idle played the Cat in the Hat, and was credited at the time for contributions to the story line. In the Toronto workshop in 2000, coordinated by Livent Inc., Andrea Martin played the Cat in the Hat. Positive early buzz set off a bidding war among New York theatre producers, with Barry and Fran Weissler acquiring the rights. The musical had its out-of-town tryout in Boston, Massachusetts at the Colonial Theatre in September 2000.

An extensive sequence adapting The Lorax was seen in the original script, which involved Jojo meeting the Once-ler after deserting the army, and receiving the last Truffula Tree seed from him, giving him the courage to save Who-ville. Relevant characters included the Lorax himself as well as Bar-ba-loots, Swomee-Swans, and Humming-Fish, who would all appear and disappear as the Once-ler told his story. The sequence faced numerous difficulties due to the show's already lengthy running time, and was ultimately cut entirely after its Boston tryout. As of 2013, MTI has begun offering the sequence as an independent "mini-musical", advertising it on the back of Seussical librettos and scripts.

Broadway
Seussical opened on Broadway at the Richard Rodgers Theatre on November 30, 2000. 
It was directed by Frank Galati and choreographed by Kathleen Marshall. Marshall's brother Rob Marshall was hired to direct the show when it returned to Broadway from Boston, though was uncredited. Originally, Catherine Zuber was the costume designer who made costumes as close to Seuss's illustrations as possible, and her costumes were seen in the Boston run. However, for Broadway, Zuber was replaced by William Ivey Long, whose costumes were more realistic and clashed with the Seussian set design. David Shiner played the Cat in the Hat, while Kevin Chamberlin played Horton, Michele Pawk played Mayzie LaBird, Stuart Zagnit and Alice Playten played Mr. and Mrs. Mayor, and Sharon Wilkins played the Sour Kangaroo.

The show received almost universally negative reviews. In January 2001, in response to falling ticket sales, producers brought in Rosie O'Donnell to replace Shiner as the Cat in the Hat for a month-long engagement. The move was criticized as stunt casting, but was successful at temporarily boosting ticket sales. In March, young pop star Aaron Carter and former Olympic gymnast Cathy Rigby were cast as JoJo and the Cat respectively for short engagements. Due to poor box office, the show closed on May 20 the same year after 198 performances. Its ultimate financial losses were estimated at $11 million, making it one of the worst financial flops in Broadway history.

US tours
Following the Broadway production, there were two US national tours. Rigby reprised her role as the Cat for the first tour which ran from September 2002 to June 2003. A second non-Equity production toured from 2003 to 2004.

The script for the first tour was reworked extensively after the show's poor showing on Broadway, resulting in the removal or reworking of several songs. The biggest change involved Jojo, who would now initially appear as an anonymous boy imagining the events onstage before the Cat pushed him into the story. Additional dialogue was included, and some songs and their reprises were cut. This version of the show is the one currently licensed by MTI as Seussical the Musical.

Off-Broadway
A 90-minute Off-Broadway production was staged at the Lucille Lortel Theatre in 2007 by Theatreworks USA. It was directed and choreographed by Marcia Milgrom Dodge. This production was downscaled for the National Tour, which had its last show in spring 2018.

West End (London)
Seussical opened on the West End at the Arts Theatre on December 4, 2012, presented by Selladoor Worldwide. It returned in 2013.

Off West End (London)
Seussical opened at the Southwark Playhouse on 22 November 2018, and ran for only 7 performances.

South Africa 
Seussical opened at the Lyric Theatre at Gold Reef City on December 20, 2019 for the festive season, presented by &CO.

One-act versions
A one-act version of the Broadway show titled Seussical Jr. has been created as part of MTI's Jr. series. It is intended to be shorter and more accessible for junior high or middle school students, and has an average run time of 60 minutes. For Jr., various songs are cut and shortened; the subplots based on The Butter Battle Book and How the Grinch Stole Christmas!, and their relevant songs and characters, are removed to make the story more understandable for younger audiences, though the Grinch retains one line during the song "Here on Who". General Schmitz is replaced in "Oh, the Thinks You Can Think!" by the Wickersham Brothers.

An even shorter version of the show, Seussical KIDS, is also available from MTI. The 30-minute KIDS version is intended for a large cast of young performers. Notable differences between Jr. and KIDS include the introduction of three Cats in the Hats and the removal of the songs "Biggest Blame Fool", "Amayzing Mayzie", and "Notice Me, Horton".

In 2004, Seussical was reworked into a "Theatre for Young Audiences" version. The cast was reduced to 12 actors, with the plot changed to focus more on Horton.

Awards and honors

Original Broadway production

Original Off-Broadway production

References

External links

 Seussical at the Internet Theatre Database
 
 Seussical at Music Theatre International
 Seussical JR. at the Music Theatre International website
 Seussical: Theatre for Young Audiences Version at the Music Theatre International website
 Seussical Audition Advice and Show Information from MusicalTheatreAudition.net
 New York Times Article on the Theatre For Young Audiences version
 Seussical the Musical Lyrics

Broadway musicals
2000 musicals
Adaptations of works by Dr. Seuss
Musicals based on novels
Musicals by Lynn Ahrens
Musicals by Stephen Flaherty
Sung-through musicals
The Cat in the Hat
Horton the Elephant